Pir Barzgu (also Romanized as Pīr Barzgū) is a village in Bid Shahr Rural District, Evaz District, Larestan County, Fars Province, Iran. At the 2006 census, its population was 43, in 8 families.

References 

Populated places in Evaz County